Ofir Haim (born April 21, 1975) is an Israeli former footballer who manages the Israel national under-19 football team.

He has been the head coach of the Israel U-19 since the beginning of the first qualifiers round, through its Elite Round, and all the way to the final match in the final tournament of the 2022 UEFA Euro Under-19 against England U-19, where his native Israel finished 2nd.

Honours

As Player
Team
Israeli Second Division
Winner (2): 1997–98, 2000–01
Toto Cup
Winner (1): 1998–99
Israel State Cup
Runner-up (2): 1996, 2003
Israeli Premier League
Runner-up (1): 2006–07
Toto Cup (Leumit)
Winner (1): 2008-09
Individual
1997–98 Liga Artzit Top Goalscorer - 26 goals2003–04 Israeli Premier League Top Goalscorer - 16 goals (joint with Shay Holtzman)

As Manager
UEFA European Under-19 Championship
Runner-up (1): 2022

See also
List of Jewish footballers
List of Jews in sports
List of Jews in sports (non-players)
List of Israelis

Footnotes

External links
  Profile and statistics of Ofir Haim on One.co.il

1975 births
Living people
Israeli footballers
Israeli Jews
Jewish footballers
Footballers from Rishon LeZion
Hapoel Rishon LeZion F.C. players
Maccabi Herzliya F.C. players
Maccabi Jaffa F.C. players
Maccabi Tel Aviv F.C. players
Hapoel Be'er Sheva F.C. players
İstanbulspor footballers
Maccabi Netanya F.C. players
Israeli expatriate footballers
Süper Lig players
Expatriate footballers in Turkey
Israeli expatriate sportspeople in Turkey
Israeli football managers
Israeli Premier League players
Hapoel Marmorek F.C. managers
Maccabi Jaffa F.C. managers
Hapoel Rishon LeZion F.C. managers
Maccabi Sha'arayim F.C. managers
Hapoel Afula F.C. managers
Hapoel Kfar Saba F.C. managers
Israeli Premier League managers
Association football forwards
Israel national football team managers